Fjorm may refer to:
 One of eleven rivers in Élivágar (Norse mythology)
 Fjorm, a main character in the storyline for the mobile phone role-playing game Fire Emblem Heroes